Tuxentius is a butterfly genus in the family Lycaenidae. They are commonly known as pied Pierrots or pies. Contained in this genus are the African species formerly placed in Castalius, except the blue-eyed Pierrot (sometimes called blue pied Pierrot) which is separated in Zintha.

Species
The members of genus Tuxentius are:
 Tuxentius calice (Hopffer, 1855) – white Pierrot
 Tuxentius carana (Hewitson, 1876) – forest pied Pierrot
 Tuxentius cretosus (Butler, 1876) – savanna pied Pierrot
 Tuxentius ertli (Aurivillius, 1907) – Ertli's Pierrot
 Tuxentius gabrieli Balint, 1999 – Gabriel's Pierrot
 Tuxentius hesperis (Vári, 1976) – western pie
 Tuxentius kaffana (Talbot, 1935)
 Tuxentius margaritaceus (Sharpe, 1892) – mountain pied Pierrot
 Tuxentius melaena (Trimen, 1887) – dark pied Pierrot
 Tuxentius stempfferi (Kielland, 1976) – Stempffer's Pierrot

Footnotes

References
  (2008): Tree of Life Web Project – Tuxentius Larsen 1982. The Pied Pierrots. Version of 2008-MAY-19. Retrieved 2009-NOV-29. 
  (2007): Markku Savela's Lepidoptera and some other life forms – Tuxentius. Version of 2007-MAY-20. Retrieved 2009-NOV-29.
Seitz, A. Die Gross-Schmetterlinge der Erde 13: Die Afrikanischen Tagfalter. Plate XIII 73

Polyommatini
Lycaenidae genera